NFPA 1600 (Standard on Disaster/Emergency Management and Business Continuity/Continuity of Operations Programs) is a standard published by the National Fire Protection Association.

References

NFPA Standards
Fire protection
Emergency management in the United States